This is an article about "Matraxia" as a family name.

Matraxia, is an Italian family name, found primarily in Sicily and specifically in Caltanisetta and the nearby area.

Origins
Matraxia is one of the common Sicilian surnames of Greek origins. Probably from the name of the dorian island Mathraki, one of the islands from which Dorians departed in order to create the famous Magna Graecia

Distribution
Italy and USA

References 

https://web.archive.org/web/20130322182734/http://www.cognomiitaliani.org/cognomi/cognomi0011at.htm
http://www.cognomix.it/mappe-dei-cognomi-italiani/Matraxia
 :it:Cognomi siciliani

Surnames
Greek-language surnames